The Mana series, known in Japan as , is a high fantasy action role-playing game series created by Koichi Ishii, with development formerly from Square, and is currently owned by Square Enix. The series began in 1991 as Final Fantasy Adventure, a Game Boy handheld side story to Square's flagship franchise Final Fantasy. The Final Fantasy elements were subsequently dropped starting with the second installment, Secret of Mana, in order to become its own series. It has grown to include games of various genres within the fictional world of Mana, with recurring stories involving a world tree, its associated holy sword, and the fight against forces that would steal their power. Several character designs, creatures, and musical themes reappear frequently.

Four games were released in the series between 1991 and 1999: the original Seiken Densetsu (1991)—Final Fantasy Adventure in North America and Mystic Quest in Europe—for the Game Boy, Secret of Mana (1993) for the Super Nintendo Entertainment System, Trials of Mana (1995) for the Super Famicom, and Legend of Mana for the PlayStation. A remake of the original game, Sword of Mana (2003), was published for the Game Boy Advance. All of the original games were action role-playing games, though they included a wide variety of gameplay mechanics, and the stories of the games were connected only thematically.

In 2006 and 2007, four more games were released as part of the World of Mana subseries, an attempt by Square Enix to release games in a series over a variety of genres and consoles. These were Children of Mana (2006), an action-oriented dungeon crawler game for the Nintendo DS; Friends of Mana (2006), a Japan-only multiplayer role-playing game for mobile phones; Dawn of Mana (2006), a 3D action-adventure game for the PlayStation 2;  and Heroes of Mana (2007), a real-time strategy game for the DS. Children was developed by Nex Entertainment and Heroes by Brownie Brown, founded by several developers of Legend, though Ishii oversaw development of all four games. Three more games have been released since the World of Mana subseries ended: Circle of Mana (2013), a Japan-only card battle game for the GREE mobile platform, Rise of Mana (2014), a Japan-only free-to-play action role-playing game for iOS, Android, and PlayStation Vita, and Adventures of Mana (2016), a 3D remake of Final Fantasy Adventure for the PlayStation Vita, iOS, and Android. In addition to the games, four manga series and one novelization have been released in the Mana franchise.

The Mana series reception has been very uneven, with early games rated higher by critics than more recent titles. Secret of Mana has been regarded as one of the best 2D action role-playing games ever made, and their music has inspired several orchestral concerts, while the games from the World of Mana series have been rated considerably lower. By 2021, the series had sold over 8 million copies.

Development

History 

Square trademarked Seiken Densetsu in 1989, intending to use it for a game project subtitled The Emergence of Excalibur, and led by Kazuhiko Aoki for the Famicom Disk System. According to early advertisements, the game would consist of an unprecedented five floppy disks, making it one of the largest titles developed for the Famicom up until that point. Although Square solicited pre-orders for the game, Kaoru Moriyama, a former Square employee, affirms that management canceled the ambitious project before it advanced beyond the early planning stages. In October 1987, customers who had placed orders were sent a letter informing them of the cancellation and had their purchases refunded. The letter also suggested to consider placing an order on another upcoming Square role-playing game in a similar vein: Final Fantasy.

In 1991, Square reused the Seiken Densetsu trademark for an unrelated Game Boy action role-playing game directed by Koichi Ishii. Originally developed under the title Gemma Knights, the game was renamed Seiken Densetsu: Final Fantasy Gaiden (published in North America as Final Fantasy Adventure and in Europe as Mystic Quest). 

Beginning with the 1993 sequel, Secret of Mana, Seiken Densetsu was subsequently "spun off" into its own series of action role-playing games distinct from Final Fantasy, named the Mana series outside Japan. Four titles in the series were released between 1993 and 2003. Secret of Mana was originally intended to be a launch title for the Super NES CD-ROM Adapter, but when the add-on was cancelled it was cut down into a standard Super NES cartridge, with many of the cut ideas appearing in other Square titles. Hirō Isono provided artwork for the game including forest landscapes. It was followed in 1995 by the then Japan-only Trials of Mana (Seiken Densetsu 3 in Japan); the game was originally planned to be released in English as Secret of Mana 2, but technical issues and localization costs prohibited the release. The final new game in the series' initial run is the 1999 Legend of Mana, developed for the PlayStation. Legend is a 2D game like its predecessors, despite the PlayStation's 3D focus, because the console could not handle the full 3D world Ishii envisioned where one could interact with natural shaped objects. 2003 saw the release of Sword of Mana, a remake of the original Seiken Densetsu for the Game Boy Advance. The remake was outsourced to Brownie Brown, which was composed of many of the Square employees who had worked on Legend.

In 2003, Square, now Square Enix, began a drive to begin developing "polymorphic content", a marketing and sales strategy to "[provide] well-known properties on several platforms, allowing exposure of the products to as wide an audience as possible". The first of these was the Compilation of Final Fantasy VII, and Square Enix intended to have campaigns for other series whereby multiple games in different genres would be developed simultaneously. Although no such project for the Mana series had been announced by this point, it was announced in late 2004 that an unnamed Mana game was in development for the upcoming Nintendo DS platform. In early 2005, Square Enix announced a World of Mana project, the application of this "polymorphic content" idea to the Mana franchise, which would include several games across different genres and platforms. These games, as with the rest of the series, would not be direct sequels or prequels to one another, even if appearing so at first glance, but would instead share thematic connections. The first release in this project and the sixth release in the Mana series was announced in September 2005 as Children of Mana for the DS. Four games were released in 2006 and 2007 in the World of Mana subseries: Children of Mana, Friends of Mana, and Dawn of Mana in 2006, and Heroes of Mana in 2007.

Each game in the World of Mana series was different, both from each other and from the previous games in the series. Children is an action-oriented dungeon crawler game for the DS, developed by Nex Entertainment; Friends is a Japan-only multiplayer role-playing game for mobile phones; Dawn is a 3D action-adventure game for the PlayStation 2; and Heroes is a real-time strategy game for the DS, developed by Brownie Brown. While Ishii was the designer for all four games, he served as the director and producer for Dawn, which was considered the main game of the four and was released as Seiken Densetsu 4 in Japan. The theme of the subseries for Ishii, especially Dawn, was about exploring how to add "the feeling of touch" to a game. He had held off on designing new Mana games after Legend was unable to meet his desires, until he felt that technology had improved enough to let him create what he envisioned. A fifth game for the subseries was considered for the Wii in 2006, but did not enter development. In April 2007, a month after the release of the final game of the World of Mana, Ishii left Square Enix to lead his own development company, named Grezzo.

The Mana series is put on hiatus until 2013, when Square Enix released Circle of Mana, a Japan-only card battle game for the GREE mobile platform. It was followed in 2014 by Rise of Mana, a Japan-only free-to-play action role-playing game for iOS, Android, and PlayStation Vita, and in 2016 by Adventures of Mana, a 3D remake of Final Fantasy Adventure for the PlayStation Vita, iOS, and Android. On August 25, 2017, a 3D remake of Secret of Mana was announced for PlayStation 4, PlayStation Vita, and Microsoft Windows, for release on February 15, 2018. The original staff was not involved in any recent game's development because many had already left Square Enix.

During the series' 30th anniversary stream were announced a new mobile spin-off game, Echoes of Mana, and new game of the series for consoles.

Creation and design 
The Mana series is the result of Koichi Ishii's desire to create a fictional world. In Ishii's opinion, Mana is not a series of video games, but rather a world which is illustrated by and can be explored through video games. When working on the series, Koichi Ishii draws inspiration from abstract images from his memories of childhood, as well as movies and fantasy books that captivated him as a child. Ishii takes care to avoid set conventions, and his influences are correspondingly very wide and non-specific. Nonetheless, among his literary influences, he acknowledges Tove Jansson's Moomin, Lewis Carroll's Alice's Adventures in Wonderland, and J. R. R. Tolkien's Lord of the Rings.

While some titles of the World of Mana series do share direct connections with other installments, the games of the series have few concrete links. There is no overall explicit in-game chronological order. Further, according to Koichi Ishii in 2006 the games do not take place in exactly the same world, and characters or elements who appear in different titles are best considered alternate versions of each other. Instead, the connections between each title are more abstract than story-based, linked only on the karmic level. Complicating this assertion, Ishii has also said in an interview that Children is set ten years after Dawn, while Heroes is set one generation prior to Trials of Mana.

Games

Main series

Spin-offs

Remakes

Common elements 

A common element of the series is its seamless, real-time battle system. The system was developed by Koichi Ishii and improved upon by Hiromichi Tanaka, out of a desire to create a system different from the one featured in the first few Final Fantasy titles. While action-based, the Mana battle system is intended to be playable even by newcomers as well as veterans. The system is coupled with the distinctive hierarchical "Ring Command" menu system, featured prominently in Secret of Mana and Trials of Mana, and to a lesser extent in later installments. Each ring is a set of icons with a textual infobox explanation which, upon selection, allow the player to use an item, cast a spell, look up in-game statistics, or change the game's settings. Navigation within a menu is achieved by rotating the ring through the cursor left or right, while switching to a different menu is achieved by pressing the up or down buttons. Although not part of the series, the spin-off Secret of Evermore, developed by the North American Square Soft, was also built upon the "Ring Command" system.

The Mana series features several recurring characters and beings, including the Final Fantasy creatures Chocobos in Final Fantasy Adventure and Legend of Mana, and Moogles in Secret of Mana and as a status ailment in Trials of Mana and Sword of Mana. Watts is a dwarf blacksmith wearing a horned helmet who upgrades the player's weaponry. Usually, an anthropomorphic cat merchant is found outside of town areas and allows a player to save the game and buy supplies at high prices. This role is played by Neko in Secret of Mana, and Niccolo in Legend of Mana and Sword of Mana. In the Japanese games these merchants share the name Nikita.

The Mana Tree and the Mana Sword, called Excalibur in Final Fantasy Adventures English version, are recurring plot devices which have been featured in every game of the series. The mystical Mana Tree is a source of magic which sustains the balance and nature of the series' world. The Mana Sword is typically used to restore this balance when it becomes lost in the games. Final Fantasy Adventure explains that if the Mana Tree dies, a member of the Mana Family will become the "seed" of a new Tree. A sprout of the Mana Tree is called a Gemma, while protectors of the Tree, who wield the Mana Sword, are called Gemma Knights. In Trials of Mana, a Goddess is said to have turned into the Mana Tree after creating the world with the Mana Sword. The Mana Tree is destroyed near the game ending in Final Fantasy Adventure and Secret of Mana, but a character becomes the new Mana Tree in the former game.

Elemental Spirits, also called Mana Spirits, are beings who govern the magic elements of the series' world, and are at the core of the games' magic system as they are used to cast magic spells. Eight types of spirits have appeared in the series since Secret of Mana, and each embodies a different element. Their names are homonyms of mythological beings or phenomena. In Secret of Mana and Trials of Mana, usage of their power is enabled upon the main characters' meeting with them. In Legend of Mana, the spirits serve as factors in the Land Creation System. In Legend of Mana and Sword of Mana, multiple spirits of the same elemental type appear. In terms of storyline, in Trials of Mana and Heroes of Mana, the spirits are charged to protect the Mana Stones in which the Mana Goddess sealed eight elemental benevodons (God-Beasts in the fan-translation of SD3). In Dawn of Mana's North American version, each spirit speaks with a particular European accent, such as French or Scottish.

The Rabite has become a sort of mascot for the Mana series, much the same way as the Chocobo represents Final Fantasy, and is one of its most recognizable icons. The Rabite resembles a bodiless, one-toothed rabbit with large ears that curve upward and form a point at the tip, and a round, puffy pink tail that moves by hopping along the ground. It is most commonly yellow colored, but also pink, lilac, black, and white, and are variously minor enemies, "superboss" characters and even friendly units and pets. Rabites are also mentioned in Final Fantasy X-2 with an accessory comically named "Rabite's Foot", which increases a character's luck statistics. Additionally, they appear in Final Fantasy Tactics Advance in the description of one of the game's optional missions as an endangered species due to being poached for good luck charms. Rabites have appeared prevalently in several pieces of Mana merchandise, including plush dolls, cushions, lighters, mousepads, straps, telephone cards, and T-shirts.

Flammie, sometimes spelled Flammy, is the name of a fictional species of flying dragons, as well as the proper name of some its members, featured in several games of the series. A Flammie's appearance is a mixture of draconian, mammalian, and reptilian features, and its coloring has varied throughout the series. Flammies typically serve as a means of transportation in the game by allowing a player's characters to ride on a Flammie's back to different locations in the game's world. In Secret of Mana and Trials of Mana, the Super NES's Mode 7 graphic capabilities allows the player to control a Flammie from either a "behind the back" third-person or top-down perspective, and fly over the landscape as it scrolls beneath them.

Music 

The Mana series has had several different composers. Final Fantasy Adventure was composed by Kenji Ito; it was his second original score. Ito's music is mainly inspired by images from the game rather than outside influences. The scores for Secret of Mana and Trials of Mana were both composed by Hiroki Kikuta. Despite difficulties in dealing with the hardware limitations, Kikuta tried to express, in the music of Secret of Mana, two "contrasting styles", namely himself and the game. This was to create an original score which would be neither pop music nor standard game music. Kikuta worked on the music for the two games mostly by himself, spending nearly 24 hours a day in his office, alternating between composing and editing to create an immersive three-dimensional sound. Kikuta considers the score for Secret of Mana his favorite creation. His compositions for Secret of Mana and Trials of Mana were partly inspired by natural landscapes. In 1995, Kikuta released an experimental album of arranged music from the two installments, titled Secret of Mana +, which features one 50-minute-long track.

Legend of Mana'''s score was composed by Yoko Shimomura, and of all her compositions, she considers it the one that best expresses herself. Kenji Ito returned to the series with Sword of Mana. He also composed roughly one third of the Children of Mana soundtrack, while the rest was composed by Masaharu Iwata and Takayuki Aihara. Ito was the main composer for Dawn of Mana, assisted by Tsuyoshi Sekito, Masayoshi Soken, and Junya Nakano, as well as main theme composer Ryuichi Sakamoto. In North America, purchasers of Dawn of Mana from participating retailers were offered a sampler disc, titled Breath of Mana, which features a selection of tracks from the game. Shimomura has returned to the series with Heroes of Mana, while also contributing one song to Rise of Mana.

 Printed adaptations 
A five-volume manga based on Legend of Mana was drawn by Shiro Amano and published in Japan by Enterbrain between 2000 and 2002.  It features a comedic story about the game's main character, here named Toto. A German version was published by Egmont Manga & Anime in 2003. A collection of four-panel comic strips, drawn by various authors and titled Sword of Mana Yonkoma Manga Theatre, was published in Japan by Square Enix on January 16, 2004. It included a questionnaire that, if sent back, allowed participants to win illustrations signed by Koichi Ishii and Shinichi Kameoka, as well as special T-shirts. Enterbrain also published a Sword of Mana manga adaptation in Japan on February 25, 2004, drawn by a collaboration of authors led by Shiro Amano. Two days later, Square Enix published a two-volume novelization of Sword of Mana in Japan written by Matsui Oohama. An original manga, named Seiken Densetsu: Princess of Mana, taking place 300 years after Children of Mana and starring the descendant of Ferrick, was drawn by Satsuki Yoshino and published in the Japanese magazine Gangan Powered from July 22, 2006, to May 27, 2010 and collected into five volumes.

 Reception 

The Mana series has been mostly well received, though each title has seen varied levels of success. RPGFan called Final Fantasy Adventure one of the best things to happen to the Game Boy, while IGN considered it the best action RPG on the console after The Legend of Zelda: Link's Awakening. GameSpot referred to Secret of Mana as "one of Square's masterpieces on the SNES". The game has appeared on several list of top games, including ranked number 97 on Famitsu's top 100 games of all time. Trials of Mana was called "easily one of the best RPGs to come out of the 16-bit era" by Nintendo Life. Famitsu rated Legend of Mana at 31/40 and Heroes of Mana at 32/40.  The NPD Group ranked Legend of Mana as the top seller the week of its release, and in 2006 was re-released as part of the Ultimate Hits series.

Many of the World of Mana titles have not been as critically successful as the original five games in the series, and though the franchise has been praised for their attempts at trying new ways of experiencing the games' fictional world, there have been various gameplay design flaws that have hindered the later games. 1UP.com commented that despite the game's excellent presentation and storytelling, Dawn of Mana did not match the level of gameplay of the early Mana games. Prior to the World of Mana games, RPGamer called the series a "treasured favorite". After the release of Heroes of Mana, they commented that the World of Mana series is "cursed", and the future of the series looked "bleak".

The music of the Mana series, especially Secret of Mana, has received wide acclaim and fan enthusiasm. The Secret of Mana soundtrack was one of the first official soundtracks of video games music released in the United States and thus before fully mainstream interest in RPGs. The Secret of Manas opening theme, "Angel's Fear", was rated at number 7 on IGN's Top Ten RPG Title tracks, calling it a "magical title song that captures our hearts". It was also featured in the third Orchestral Game Concert. Secret of Mana is also the number 6 most remixed soundtrack on the popular video game music site OverClocked ReMix, with Trials of Mana tied at 18. The music of the other titles have also been well received. RPGFan called the music to Final Fantasy Adventure "addictive", despite its low, MIDI-like quality. GameSpy called Children of Manas music some of the best Nintendo DS music yet and referred to it as "beautiful". Game Informer complimented Dawn of Manas music, calling it good. IGN referred to Legend of Manas music as "beautiful" and stated the background music brought "intensity", "suspense", and "subtle nuance" to the game. Other reviewers echoed similar praise to GameSpot, calling the music "excellently orchestrated" and RPGFan calling it one of the game's good points.

The Mana series has sold well overall, and as of March 2011, series titles have sold over 6 million units. The original Seiken Densetsu sold over 700,000 units, and its remake Sword of Mana sold over 277,000 copies in Japan. Secret of Mana has shipped over 1.83 million copies worldwide. Legend of Mana sold over 400,000 units in its first week alone as the highest-selling release that week in Japan, and over 700,000 copies in Japan by the end of the year. Children of Mana sold over 281,000 copies in Japan, and Dawn of Mana sold over 410,000 copies worldwide. Heroes of Mana sold over 178,000 copies worldwide. The PlayStation Vita version of Rise of Mana'' downloaded over 100,000 times. By 2021, the game series had sold over 8 million copies.

See also
 List of Japanese role-playing game franchises
 List of Square Enix video game franchises

Notes

References

 
Action role-playing video games
Seiken Densetsu: The Emergence of Excalibur
Square Enix franchises
Video game franchises
2000 manga
2004 manga
2007 manga
Video game franchises introduced in 1991